Major Davis (27 March 1882 – 27 April 1959) was an English cricketer who played one first-class match, for Worcestershire against Oxford University in 1911. He scored 29 and 6, and took one catch, to dismiss Oxford captain John Evans.

Davis was born in Lye, then Worcestershire; he died at the age of 71 in Blakebrook, Kidderminster.

His brother John played four times for Worcestershire in 1922.

Note: it is not known whether "Major" was a name or a title.

External links
 
 Statistical summary from CricketArchive

1880s births
1959 deaths
English cricketers
Worcestershire cricketers